61/49 is the sixth studio album by The Romantics. It was released in 2003 on Web Entertainment and is the only rock album on the label.

Track listing

Personnel

The Romantics
 Wally Palmar – vocals, guitar, harmonica
 Mike Skill – bass guitar, vocals
 Coz Canler – guitar, vocals
 Clem Burke – drums on tracks 8-9

Additional musicians
 Jimmy Marinos – drums on tracks 1-3, 5-6
 Johnny "Bee" Badanjek – drums on tracks 4 & 7
 Eddie Hawrysch – Wurlitzer electric piano on track 5
 Luis Resto – Hammond organ on tracks 6 & 9, Mellotron and tympanis on track 9, accordion and concertina on track 10.
 Tino – guiro on track 6
 Joel Marin – electric 12-string on track 7
 Michael Millman – string bass, cellos on track 9
 Doug Nahory – piano, harpsichord on track 10
 Bruce Witkin – percussion on track 10
 Fountain Day School 4th grade – vocals on track 10

References

2003 albums
The Romantics albums
Web Entertainment albums